Scott Von der Ahe (born October 12, 1975) is a former American football linebacker. He played for the Indianapolis Colts in 1997.

References

1975 births
Living people
People from Lancaster, California
Sportspeople from Los Angeles County, California
Players of American football from California
American football linebackers
Iowa Hawkeyes football players
Arizona State Sun Devils football players
Indianapolis Colts players